The 1983 Primera División season was the 92nd season of top-flight football in Argentina. Independiente won the Metropolitano (13th title) and Estudiantes de La Plata won the Nacional championship (4th title). 

Nueva Chicago and Racing Club were relegated by the average system.

Metropolitano Championship

Nacional Championship

1st step

Group A

Group B

Group C

Group D

Group E

Group F

Group G

Group H

2nd step

Group A

Group B

Group C

Group D

Group E

Group F

Group G

Group H

1/8 finals

Quarterfinals

Semifinals

Finals

First leg

Second leg 

Estudiantes LP won the final with the aggregate score of 3–2.

References

Argentine Primera División seasons
p
p
Primera Division
Arg